Kuruvi is a 2008 Indian Tamil-language  superhero comedy film written and directed by Dharani, and produced by Udhayanidhi Stalin. The film stars Vijay in the titular role with Trisha and Suman in other prominent roles. Vivek, Ashish Vidyarthi, Manivannan and Malavika played supporting roles in the movie. The film was released on 3 May 2008, and was an above average  at the domestic box office. It also marked Nivetha Thomas's Tamil debut as a child artist.

The film has collected $1,018,120 or 8 crore and successful at the overseas box office. It was one of the highest grossing Tamil films of 2008 in United Kingdom alone, collecting £263,919 or 3 crore. In 2021, The film was re-released in Kerala.

Plot 
Vetrivel alias Velu, a car racer lives with his large family in Chennai. His father Singamuthu had gone to Kadapa in Andhra Pradesh to work at a colliery and never returned, prompting Velu and his family to think that he is dead. Velu learns that a Malaysia-based crime boss named Koccha owed his father a huge sum of money. Velu and his friend Ops travel to Malaysia as Kuruvi, the trade jargon for low-level contraband carriers. They come to Malaysia at a time when internal rivalry and problems are surfacing in Koccha's family. 

Koccha's younger sister Radhadevi alias Devi has refused to marry Soori, the brother of Konda Reddy, Koccha's Kadapa-based business associate. Irritated and preoccupied, Koccha doesn't devote any time or attention to resolve Velu's problem. Velu is ill-treated and thrown out of Koccha's place without any help. Determined to return to India only after his father's issue is solved to his satisfaction, Velu conceals himself in Koccha's residence and steals a large diamond owned by Koccha, feeling that it would pay off his father's debt, and returns to India with Ops. Devi also follows Velu to India, having fallen in love with him, when he saves her from falling from a tall building during New Year's Eve. 

Knowing that Velu has stolen his diamond, Koccha and his gang visit Velu's house and threaten his family with dire consequences unless Velu returns the diamond. After confronting Koccha, Velu learns that his father is alive and is being held as bonded labour along with many innocent people at Kadapa. Singamuthu had discovered diamonds at the colliery, but refused to allow Koccha and Konda Reddy to illegally mine the diamonds for their own benefit. He had been held prisoner in Kadapa ever since. Velu immediately leaves for Kadapa, where he encounters Koccha again. He throws him onto a moving train thereby paralyzing him.

Velu soon discovers a slave camp run by Koccha and Konda Reddy at the colliery, where a womanising goon named Kadapa Raja is torturing the inmates, including Singamuthu. Velu sneaks into Koccha's mansion on the eve of Devi's wedding with Konda Reddy's younger brother Soori. With the help of Devi who reveals that Koccha's own fingerprint is his laptop's password, he unlocks Koccha's laptop. On seeing Koccha's laptop, Velu and Devi learn that Koccha and his associates have been cheating the government by illegally mining diamonds against the law and also have secret government documents in their possession. 

Velu also paralyzes Soori by getting him stung by bees on the wedding day thereby stopping the wedding. He single-handedly takes on Konda Reddy, Kadapa Raja and their henchmen, killing them all. He drags Konda Reddy's dead body to Koccha's mansion. Koccha, who now uses a wheelchair, recovers on seeing the dead body of his associate and attempts to shoot Velu. He is arrested at that moment by a STF officer Raj, who reveals that Velu had forwarded all the information to them from Koccha's laptop. Singamuthu and the others are reunited with their families, and Velu reunites with Devi.

Cast

Production 
It was announced in 2007 that Udhayanidhi Stalin, son of M. K. Stalin and grandson of the then Tamil Nadu Chief minister M. Karunanidhi would produce films under his production banner Red Giant Movies. The film marked the comeback of Dharani and announced the project titled Kuruvi featuring most of the cast and crew of director's previous film Ghilli. It was rumoured that Kuruvi was titled because the lead hero was named as Guru V which proved false. Kuruvi or Pura is term used by Tamil people in the southeast Asia towards illegal immigrants.

Vidya Balan and Nayanthara were first approached to be heroines of the film, but Trisha was later selected to be paired with Vijay for the fourth time after Ghilli (2004), Thirupaachi (2005) and Aathi (2006). Vadivelu was initially approached for the film but he was replaced by Vivek.

A stunt scene was picturised with Vijay taking on few men who belong to the African mafia in a huge bar-cum-disco set erected for this purpose. In Kuruvi, the director used a chopper to shoot an entire song sequence to give it a feel of grandeur which was shot in Kuala Lumpur. in  KL Tower

A huge set was erected at the MGR film city for major portion of the film. The team had even erected another set nearby in Sriperumbudur for shooting a song sequence, which featured some models from Bangalore and Mumbai. Sadly, rains held up the shooting for two days – by the time the call sheet of the models ended. Another fight scene was picturised at AVM Studios with a grand set resembling a bar.

Major portions of the movie’s second half which involved mines were picturised at locations near Salem.

Soundtrack 
The soundtrack is composed by Vidyasagar. The film's audio launch was held at the Little Flower Convent on 16 April 2008 in Chennai. Behindwoods wrote, "Vidyasagar seems to have reinvented himself as a fairly noisy composer here! The metallic twang that accompanies the songs is not too pleasant. Maybe the plot calls for such treatment, but you come away wondering whether Vidyasagar heartily relished doing this". Rediff wrote:"Vidyasagar's music has only sheen, no soul". Karthik Srinivasan of Millblog wrote, "Kuruvi is no Gilli, but does have its own quirky charm".

The song "Mozha Mozhannu" created controversy because the name of freedom fighter "Thillaiyadi Valliyamma" was mentioned in the song. Shreya Ghoshal was nominated for Filmfare Awards South for Best Female Playback Singer – Tamil

Release

Critical reception 
Kuruvi received mixed reviews from critics.

Rediff  wrote "Kuruvi's got everything to appeal to Vijay fans – but Dharani the director is lost in this melee of fist-fights and elementary comedy".  Behindwoods rated the movie at 2.5 out of 5 stars and stated "If you go to see Kuruvi with lowered expectations, you may end up liking it. But those who are looking for big build-up sequences and large Ghilli-like payoffs – stay away.". 

Sify wrote:"To give Dharani his due, Kuruvi is watchable in parts, for die-hard fans of Vijay. For ordinary viewers, the film lacks a basic story and stretches ones patience for nearly three hours".Ananda Vikatan rated the film 39 out of 100. 

Indiaglitz wrote "Kuruvi, a racy thriller loaded with romance and action, is a sure treat for Vijay fans".The Hindu wrote "Kuruvi tries its best to fly high, only that the effort isn’t enough because earlier Ghilli had soared much higher. Of course, Dharani keeps up the momentum and things move fast to the midway point".

Home media 

The satellite rights of the Tamil and Malayalam version were sold to Kalaignar TV and Kairali TV.

See also 
 List of films featuring slavery

Notelist

References

External links 

2000s masala films
2000s Tamil-language films
2008 action comedy films
2008 films
Films directed by Dharani
Indian action comedy films
Indian superhero films
Films about Indian slavery